Maciej Dakowicz (born 20 November 1976) is a Polish street photographer, photojournalist and gallerist. He is from Białystok in North East Poland. Dakowicz is best known for his series of photographs of Cardiff night-life titled Cardiff after Dark. He and others set up and ran Third Floor Gallery in Cardiff and he was a member of the In-Public street photography collective.

Life and work
Dakowicz studied computer science in Poland (2000). He lived in Cardiff, Wales, between 2004 and 2012, where he worked and studied for his PhD at the University of Glamorgan  (now the University of South Wales) (2010) where he also worked. He left work at the university in 2009 and completed his PhD in 2010. In 2010 he set up and ran Third Floor Gallery along with Joni Karanka and Bartosz Nowicki. He left Cardiff for London, and since 2013 has been based in Mumbai, photographing in Tunisia, Yemen, India and Bangladesh.

Dakowicz is best known for his series of photographs of Cardiff night-life titled Cardiff after Dark, also the name of his later book. Photographed over four years, photographs from the series have featured in magazines and been exhibited in galleries. Individual images from the series have also been used out of context and with misleading captions by the British tabloid media to support a single narrative about alcoholic excess. This tabloid practice has been criticised; for example, Jonathan Jones wrote in The Guardian that "Humour is the most obvious thing about his pictures, and their attraction lies in the way they balance grotesque abandon with poised, coolly beautiful lighting." Sean O'Hagan said in The Guardian that "it is not all outrageousness and vulgarity: Dakowicz also catches the sense of camaraderie and celebration in Cardiff on a Saturday night. He has an outsider's eye for telling detail, a way of showing us, in often brilliantly dramatic fashion and with a degree of gleeful humour, what is right under our noses."

In March 2013 Dakowicz became a member of the In-Public street photography collective.

His book Sonepur Mela (2021) contains photographs taken at Sonepur Cattle Fair in India between 2010 and 2017.

Publications

Books of work by Dakowicz
Sixteen Countries.
First edition. Self published, Blurb.
Second edition, 2009. Self published, Blurb. Contains 114 photographs from between 2003 and 2008.
Cardiff after Dark. London: Thames & Hudson, 2012. . Introduction by Sean O'Hagan.
Sonepur Mela. Self-published, 2021. . With an introduction by Gareth Fitzpatrick.

Books with contributions by Dakowicz
Flash Forward 2009. Edited by Simon Bainbridge. Toronto: Magenta Foundation. .
Street Photography Now. London: Thames & Hudson, 2010.  (hardback). London: Thames & Hudson, 2011.  (paperback). Edited by Sophie Howarth and Stephen McLaren.
Hijacked III: Australia / United Kingdom. Cottesloe, W.A.: Big City Press; Heidelberg: Kenrer, 2012. . Exhibition catalogue.
Read This If You Want to Take Great Photographs. By Henry Carroll. London: Laurence King, 2014. .
The World Atlas of Street Photography. New Haven and London: Yale University: 2014, . Edited by Jackie Higgins. With a foreword by Max Kozloff.
100 Great Street Photographs. Munich, London, New York: Prestel, 2017. By David Gibson. . Contains a commentary on and a photograph by Dakowicz.

Exhibitions

Solo exhibitions
2011: Cardiff by Night. Galeria im. Sleńdzińskich, Białystok, Poland.
2011: BigLittleCity, Old Library, Cardiff.
 2012: China Impressions, Paris Van Java shopping mall, Bandung, Indonesia.
 2012: Cardiff after Dark, Third Floor Gallery, Cardiff.

Exhibitions with others or during festivals
Street Photography Now, Third Floor Gallery, Cardiff, October–November 2010, and toured to Contributed Studio for the Arts, Berlin, December 2010 – January 2011; Museum of Printing, Historical Museum of Warsaw, Warsaw, November 2011 – January 2012. Photographs from the book Street Photography Now (2011).
Street Photography Now, shop windows throughout the Canal Saint-Martin area, part of Mois de la Photo-OFF, Paris, November 2010; Gallery Lichtblick, Cologne, 2010; Uno Art Space, Stuttgart, April–June 2011.
2011: Cardiff after Dark screened at Visa pour l'image 2011, Perpignan, France.
2011: Mass Photography: Blackpool through the Camera. Grundy Art Gallery, Blackpool.
 2013: Divine Bodies, Laing Art Gallery, Newcastle.
 2013: Cardiff After Dark, White Cloth Gallery, Leeds, UK. With Donald Weber.
2015: The Sharp Eye. In-Public in Mexico, Foto Mexico, Cine Tonalá, Mexico City, Mexico, October–November 2015. Slideshow of photographs.

Awards
2009: 170 Lat Fotografii = 170 Years of Photography, Plfoto.com, OnePhoto.net and Obiektywni.pl, Poland, "People" Category Winner.
2009: VIVA! Photo Awards 2009, Poland, The Grand Prix Award.
2009: Magenta Flash Forward Emerging Photographer 2009.
2009: Digital Camera Photographer of the Year 2009, UK, 3rd place, Highly Commended and Commended in "This is Britain" Category.
2010: Digital Camera Photographer of the Year 2010, UK, 2nd place in the "Documentary" category.
2010: Digital Camera Photographer of the Year 2010, UK, 3rd place in the "Adrenaline" category.
2010: BZ WBK Press Photo 2010, Poland, 3rd place in the "Civilisation" category.
2010: Wielki Konkurs National Geographic 2010, Poland, Honourable Mention in the "Reportage" category.
2011: BZ WBK Press Photo 2011, Poland, 2nd place in the "Society" category.
2011: BZ WBK Press Photo 2011, Poland, 3rd place in the "Nature" category.
2016: First prize, News category, BZ WBK Press Foto, Poland. For photographs of the aftermath of an earthquake in Nepal, 2015.
2018: First Place, Single Image category, LensCulture Street Photography Awards, for "Beach Scene, Chaung Tha, Myanmar"

Notes

References

External links

Maciej Dakowicz at In-Public street photography collective
Flickr Blog - 5 Questions for Maciej Dakowicz

Polish photographers
Street photographers
Polish expatriates in the United Kingdom
Living people
1976 births
Alumni of the University of South Wales
Alumni of the University of Glamorgan
People from Białystok